The New Brunswick Performing Arts Center is a complex in New Brunswick, New Jersey's Civic Square government and cultural district, in the United States. Construction for the US$172 million, 23-story multi-use property began in 2017 and was completed in 2019. It's official opening took place September 4, 2019.

The cultural center is home to American Repertory Ballet, Crossroads Theatre, George Street Playhouse, and the theaters for Rutgers University's Mason Gross School of the Arts.

Architecture
The theater is part of a larger residential and commercial 23-story complex and includes 18 stories of residential units. One of the tallest buildings in New Brunswick, it was designed by Elkus Manfredi Architects and comprises two state-of-the-art theaters, dedicated rehearsal studios, and academic and office space. Atop the complex are 207 residential apartments and 30,000 square feet of office space. There is also a new parking garage with 344 parking spaces.

References 

Theatres in New Jersey
2017 establishments in New Jersey
Tourist attractions in New Brunswick, New Jersey
Buildings and structures in New Brunswick, New Jersey
Theatres completed in 2019
Performing arts centers in New Jersey